KDIA (1640 kHz) is a commercial AM radio station licensed to Vallejo, California, and serving the San Francisco Bay Area.  It is owned by the Salem Media Group and broadcasts a Christian talk and teaching radio format.  Salem also owns KFAX 1100 AM which airs a separate schedule of Christian programming.  The radio studios and offices are on Liberty Street in Fremont. 

KDIA transmits 10,000 watts.  By day, it is non-directional, using one of the KKSF 910 AM towers in Richmond on San Francisco Bay.  At night, it is directional, using a four-tower array on Noble Road in Vallejo.

History
KDIA is a separate entity from the station at 1310 AM that held the KDIA call letters for many years. The 1640 AM frequency was licensed as part of an extension of the AM band, and adopted the abandoned KDIA call letters.

In 1979, a World Administrative Radio Conference (WARC-79) adopted "Radio Regulation No. 480", which stated that "In Region 2, the use of the band 1605-1705 kHz by stations of the broadcasting service shall be subject to a plan to be established by a regional administrative radio conference..." As a consequence, on June 8, 1988 an ITU-sponsored conference held at Rio de Janeiro, Brazil adopted provisions, effective July 1, 1990, to extend the upper end of the Region 2 AM broadcast band, by adding ten frequencies which spanned from 1610 kHz to 1700 kHz.

While the Federal Communications Commission (FCC) was still making U.S. preparations to populate the additional frequencies, known as the "Expanded Band", a provision was added to the Communications Act of 1934 in late 1991 which mandated that priority for assignments would be given to existing daytime-only stations that were located in a community with a population over 100,000, and which also did not have any full-time stations. Taking advantage of this provision, on March 19, 1996 KXBT (now KDYA), 1190 AM in Vallejo, began to also broadcast on 1640 kHz, as the second U.S. station, following WJDM in Elizabeth, New Jersey, authorized to operate on an expanded band frequency.

On March 22, 1996, the FCC issued an updated list of expanded band allotments, which now assigned KXBT to 1630 kHz, so transmissions were switched to that frequency. On March 17, 1997 the FCC released a revised roster of eighty-eight expanded band assignments, with KXBT designated to move back to 1640 kHz. The expanded band operation was now treated as being a separate station with its own unique call sign, and a Construction Permit for it was assigned the call letters KDIA on April 17, 1998.

The FCC's initial policy was that both the original station and its expanded band counterpart could operate simultaneously for up to five years, after which owners would have to turn in one of the two licenses, depending on whether they preferred the new assignment or elected to remain on the original frequency. However, this deadline has been extended multiple times, and both stations have remained authorized. One restriction is that the FCC has generally required paired original and expanded band stations to remain under common ownership.

KDIA was put on the air in 1998 by Baybridge Communications, and has been a Christian talk station since 2002. It has since gone through two upgrades and now covers the San Francisco Bay Area, day and night. In 2009, it became the flagship station for Spanish language night time broadcasts of Oakland Athletics baseball until the middle of the 2010 season, while sibling station KDYA broadcast daytime games.

The station was put on the air by then KUIC Chief Engineer Alan McCarthy (now deceased). The original transmitter was a used Continental 316 Doherty layout converted by Contract Engineer Skipp May. The original antenna system was a diplex layout with sister station 1190, which was formerly KNBA Vallejo. The antenna system was designed by Rich Green and installed by Ralph Jones (and Skipp May). The problematic 316 transmitter was upgraded to a BE sometime circa 1996. Alan McCarthy left "Quick Broadcasting" for a position at 1530 KFBK Sacramento. McCarthy died from a heart attack.

Effective June 1, 2021, Baybridge Communications sold KDIA and sister station KDYA to Salem Media Group for $600,000.

History of the original KDIA

Use of the KDIA call sign had a prior history in the San Francisco Bay area, and was most recently used on 1310 AM by a station that began broadcasting as KLS in 1922. In 1945, it changed its call letters to KWBR and changed its format to focus on an African-American audience. In 1959, it was bought by the owners of Memphis radio station WDIA, and the call letters were changed to KDIA. During the 1960s through the 1980s, the station was the premier soul and funk station in the San Francisco Bay Area. The station helped launch the careers of such musicians as Sly and the Family Stone.  Its tagline at that time was "KDIA, Lucky 13."

For four months in 1984-85 the station was owned by Adam Clayton Powell III, during which time it carried the call letters KFYI and broadcast an all-news format.

In the early 1990s KDIA was co-owned by then mayor of Oakland, California, Elihu Harris with then California State Assembly Speaker Willie Brown. In 1992, Oakland journalist Chauncey Bailey returned to the Bay Area to work as public affairs director and newscaster on KDIA. Bailey later became the editor of the Oakland Post and was murdered on the streets of downtown Oakland.

References

External links
 KDIA official website
 Bay Area Radio Museum KDIA Collection Audio archive of KDIA broadcasts and historical information
 Classic KDIA Lucky 13 Digital Radio Station

DIA
Radio stations established in 1998
DIA
Mass media in Vallejo, California
Salem Media Group properties